Wattegama (Sinhala: වත්තේගම, Tamil:வத்தேகம) is a town and Urban Council in Kandy District in the Central Province of Sri Lanka.

See also 
Wattegama Central College

References

Populated places in Kandy District
Suburbs of Kandy